Tiiu Kull   (born 26 August 1958) is an Estonian botanist. She specialises in the study of population dynamics in plant species and has published an extensive number of papers on the subject. In 1997 she conducted a study, "Population studies of native orchids in Estonia".

More recently Kull's research has seen her examine the irregularity of temporal patterns in perennial herbs as a phenomenon of intermodular interactions.

References

External links
Homepage
Profile in Estonian Research Information System (ETIS)

21st-century Estonian botanists
1958 births
Living people
Academic staff of the Estonian University of Life Sciences
20th-century Estonian botanists